The National Biotechnology Research Park is an industrial park in Nangang District, Taipei, Taiwan.

History

The area where the industrial park stands today used to be the site for the 202nd arsenal of Ministry of National Defense. Later on, the area was decided to be redeveloped into an industrial park during the presidency of Chen Shui-bian. The construction project was launch in 2007. Hampered by several controversies, the construction finally began in 2014. The industrial park was developed with a budget of NT$22.5 billion and construction of was completed on 14 March 2018. The industrial park was inaugurated on 15 October 2018 by President Tsai Ing-wen.

Tenants
 Development Center for Biotechnology
 Food and Drug Administration
 National Laboratory Animal Center

Transportation
The industrial park is accessible within walking distance south of Nangang Station of Taipei Metro.

See also
 Ministry of Science and Technology (Taiwan)

References

2018 establishments in Taiwan
Buildings and structures in Taipei
Economy of Taipei
Science parks in Taiwan